Nia is a given name which appears in many cultures.

In Bulgaria, it is a short form of the feminine name Evgenia. 

In English it is a short form of the feminine given name Antonia used in Mexico, the United States, most of Canada, Guyana, the United Kingdom, Ireland, Australia, New Zealand, Philippines, Peninsular Malaysia, India, Pakistan, Liberia, Sierra Leone, Ghana, Namibia, South Africa, Botswana, Zimbabwe, Zambia, Malawi, Tanzania, Uganda, Kenya, Sudan, South Sudan, Ethiopia, Cameroon, and Nigeria. 

In Wales it is used as a feminine given name deriving from the Old Irish name Niamh, meaning "bright". 

It is also an Afro-Asiatic name of Swahili origins used in the East African nations of Egypt, Sudan, South Sudan, Ethiopia, Somalia, Somaliland, Kenya, Uganda, Rwanda, Burundi, Tanzania, Zambia, Mozambique, Zimbabwe, Comoros, Mayotte, and Madagascar, meaning "purpose".

Nia (Georgian: ნია) is a popular name in Georgia.

Given name
 Nia Abdallah (born 1984), American Taekwondoist
 Nia Ali (born 1988), American athlete
 Nia Faith Betty (born 2001), Canadian activist and fashion designer
 Nia Burks (born 1984), American artist
 Nia Caron, Welsh actress 
 Nia Coffey (born 1995), American basketball player
 Nia Daniati (born 1964), Indonesian singer and actress
 Nia Dennis (born 1999), American artistic gymnast
 Nia Franklin (born 1993), American soprano and beauty queen (Miss America 2019)
 Nia Frazier, American child dancer on the reality show, Dance Moms
 Nia Gill (born 1948), American politician
 Nia Griffith (born 1956), Welsh politician
 Nia-Malika Henderson (born 1974), American journalist 
 Nia Imara, American astrophysicist
 Nia Jones (born 1992), Welsh netball and football player
 Nia King, American celebrity
 Nia Künzer (born 1980), German football player.
 Nia Long (born 1970), American actress
 Nia Love, American dancer and choreographer 
 Nia Medi, Welsh actress and author
 Nia Misikea (born 1993), Niuean male field athlete
 Nia Moore, American reality television personality on The Real World: Portland and The Challenge
 Nia Rader, half of the American YouTube Vlogging duo Sam and Nia
 Nia Roberts (actress) (born 1972), Welsh actress
 Nia Roberts (presenter), Welsh presenter
 Nia Sanchez (born 1990), American beauty queen (Miss USA 2014)
 Nia Segamain (fl. c.3rd/4th century BC), High King of Ireland
 Nia Sharma (born 1990), Indian actress
 Nia Tsivtsivadze (born 1994), Georgian beauty queen (Miss Georgia 2017)
 Nia Williams (born 1990), American football player

Nickname
Nia Dinata, professional name  of Nurkurniati Aisyah Dewi, (born 1970), Indonesian film director
Nia Jax, ring name of Savelina Fanene, (born 1984), American professional wrestler
Nia Peeples, nickname of Virenia Gwendolyn Peeples (born 1961), American singer and actress
Nia Ramadhani, stage name of Prianti Nur Ramadhani, (born 16 April 1990), Indonesian entertainer
Nia Vardalos, nickname of Antonia Eugenia Vardalos (born 1962), Canadian actress, screenwriter, and producer
Nia Zulkarnaen, nickname of Vanya Zulkarnaen (born 1970), Indonesian singer, actress and producer

Middle name
Crimthann Nia Náir (fl. 12 BC – AD 9), High King of Ireland.
Cairbre Nia Fer (fl. 27 BC – AD 14), King of Tara

Surname
Bethan Nia, Welsh musician
Ahmad Soleimani Nia, Iranian actor

Fictional characters
 Nia the Helpful Engine, a character from the British-American TV series Thomas & Friends
 Nia, a character from the My Scene doll line
 Nia, a Turkish Van raced cat from a cartoon called Canimals
 Nia, a character from the Pop'n Music video game series
 Nia, a main character in Xenoblade Chronicles 2
 Nia Honjou, a character in the Date A Live light novel series.
 Nia Moseby, The Suite Life of Zack & Cody character
Nia Nal, also known by her code name Dreamer, fictional DC Comics character from Supergirl TV series
 Nia Teppelin, a main protagonist in Tengen Toppa Gurren Lagann
 Nia Tudzharova, character in Bulgarian TV series, Undercover

 Nia (Charles d'Artanian), a female character in Hyakka Ryōran

See also
Niia (born 1988), American musician
Nea (given name)
Nie (surname)

References

Bulgarian feminine given names
English feminine given names
Welsh feminine given names